The canton of Herblay-sur-Seine (before 2021: Herblay) is an administrative division of the Val-d'Oise department, Île-de-France region, northern France. Its borders were modified at the French canton reorganisation which came into effect in March 2015. Its seat is in Herblay-sur-Seine.

It consists of the following communes:
La Frette-sur-Seine
Herblay-sur-Seine
Montigny-lès-Cormeilles

References

Cantons of Val-d'Oise